Burning Birds (දැවෙන විහඟුන්) is a 2018 Sri Lankan adult drama film written and directed by Sanjeewa Pushpakumara and co-produced by Pushpakumara and Antonin Dedet. It stars Anoma Janadari and Samanalee Fonseka with Mahendra Perera and Shyam Fernando. The music was composed by R. Abaji and Philip David Sheppard. The film was premiered in the main competition of the 21st Busan International Film Festival in 2016.

The film was released in Sri Lanka on 29 June 2018 by the National Film Corporation of Sri Lanka through its Rithma circuit cinemas. The director's cut was released from 26 July 2018 to 9 August 2018 only in three theaters - Regal Colombo, Lido Borella and Skylite Malabe, under the "Adults Only" banner.

The film successfully passed 50 days in theaters. It is the 1307th Sri Lankan film in the Sinhala cinema. With many awards at Derana Film Awards 2019, the film was  re-screened in few theaters for a limited engagement including Savoy Premier at 1.30 pm.

Cast
 Samanalee Fonseka as Wasana
 Anoma Janadari as Kusum
 Mahendra Perera as owner of slaughter house
 Chandani Seneviratne as Sumana
 Leonie Kotelawala as mother-in-law/grandmother
 Pubudu Chathuranga as owner of brothel
 Thissa Bandaranayaka as principal
 Shyam Fernando as paramilitary leader
 Sanjeewa Dissanayake as father
 Dasun Pathirana as Bus driver
 Dharmapriya Dias as Police inspector 
 D.B. Gangodathenna as Old man at brothel
 Darshan Dharmaraj as animal slaughter

Awards and nominations
 15th International Film Festival and Forum on Human Rights in Geneva (FIFDH)- (Winner) The Best Film (Grand Prix)
 15th International Film Festival and Forum on Human Rights in Geneva (FIFDH)- (Winner) Youth Jury Award
 21st Busan International Film Festival, 2016 – New Currents Competition - (Nominated) The Best Film
 17th International Film Festival Tokyo Filmex, 2016 – (Winner) Special Jury Prize (the 2nd Prize)
 46th International Film Festival Rotterdam, 2017 – Bright Future Competition
 40th Gothenburg Film Festival, 2017 – Ingmar Bergman Competition -(Nominated) The Ingmar Bergman Award
 27th African, Asian and Latin American Film Festival in Milan-(Nominated)-The Best Film
 35th Munich International Film Festival
 32nd Cinema Jove, Valencia International Film Festival (in Competition)
 3rd Valletta Film Festival
 5th Lake Como Film Festival (in Competition) - Special Jury Mention (Student Jury)
 70th Locarno Film Festival
 14th Anonimul Film Festival (In Competition)
 Asian Film Festival Barcelona
 13th Kazan International Film Festival, Russia
 3rd Jafna International Cinema Festival, Sri Lanka
 5th South Asian Film Festival in Paris - FFAST
 3rd Asian World Film Festival in Los Angeles - (Winner) Best Actress
 12th Jogja-Netpac International Film Festival, Indonesia (in competition)
 16th Pune International Film Festival, India (World Cinema)
 8th Yashwant International Film Festival, Mumbai, 2018
 9th SAARC Film Festival ( in Competition) - Best Actress & Best Editor (winners)
 Presidential Film Awards (2019),Sri Lanka - Best Film, Best Director, Best Script, Best Actress, Best Actor, Best Supporting Actress
 Derana TV Film Awards (2019), Sri Lanka - Best Director, Best Actress, Best Supporting Actress, Best Supporting Actor, Best Make-up

References

External links
 

සම්මානනීය දැවෙන විහඟුන් අධ්‍යක්ෂ සංජීව පුෂ්පකුමාර
දැවෙන විහඟුන් ළඟදී පියඹයි
වැන්දඹු මවකගේ ජීවන අරගලය
සංක්‍රාන්තික මොහොත සහ දැවෙන විහඟුන් ..

2016 films
2010s Sinhala-language films
Sri Lankan drama films
2016 drama films